Mădălina is a Romanian feminine given name that may refer to:

Mădălina Cioveie (born 1983), Romanian aerobic gymnast
Mădălina Diana Ghenea (born 1987), Romanian-Italian actress and model
Mădălina Gojnea (born 1987), Romanian tennis player
Mădălina Manole (1967–2010), Romanian pop recording artist
Mădălina Zamfirescu (born 1994), Romanian handballer

Romanian feminine given names